Ronald Sampson, CBE, is an English administrator who served as Chief Executive of the Falkland Islands from April 1989 until September 1994.

During his time as Chief Executive, Sampson worked to improve up the infrastructure of the Falkland Islands in the wake of the 1982 war. Following his retirement in 1994, Sampson was made a Commander of the Order of the British Empire by Queen Elizabeth II.

Sources 

Chief Executives of the Falkland Islands
Commanders of the Order of the British Empire
Living people
Year of birth missing (living people)